Braudabad Railway Station (Sindhi: برائود آباد ريلوي اسٽيشن) is located in Braudabad village, Thatta district of Sindh province, Pakistan.

Services
The following trains stop at Braudabad station:

See also
 List of railway stations in Pakistan
 Pakistan Railways

References

External links
Map Braudabad

Railway stations in Thatta District
Railway stations on Karachi–Peshawar Line (ML 1)